Simon Grover (born 25 November 1966) is a British actor  and writer. He is also a Green Party Councillor on St Albans City Council.

As an actor, he played main characters in two BBC children's series: Gigglebiz and Tweenies. He appeared in the feature film Harry Potter and the Deathly Hallows – Part 1 (2010), in which he played a Death Eater. He has also written for children's television series, including Waybuloo, Fimbles, Bobinogs, Big Cook, Little Cook, Fun Song Factory, Driver Dan's Story Train, and Planet Cook.

Partial filmography

References

1966 births
Living people
British male television actors
British writers